The St. John the Baptist Cathedral, also called Santa Cruz do Sul Cathedral, is a Roman Catholic cathedral located in the central area of Santa Cruz do Sul, in front of Getúlio Vargas Square in Brazil.

It has a height of 26 meters in its central nave but the towers reach 83 meters.

Construction started on February 1, 1928, under the direction of Simon Gramlich, author of the project and later under the direction of engineer Ernesto Matheis.

On August 2, 1936, the church was ready, but the work was completed only in 1977 with the construction of two main towers.

In 1959, with the creation of the Diocese of Santa Cruz do Sul, with jurisdiction over several municipalities, the church became known as the cathedral of St. John the Baptist.

See also
Roman Catholicism in Brazil
St. John the Baptist Cathedral

References

Roman Catholic cathedrals in Rio Grande do Sul
Roman Catholic churches completed in 1977
Santa Cruz do Sul
20th-century Roman Catholic church buildings in Brazil